A rock fragment, in sedimentary geology, is a sand-sized particle or sand grain that is made up of multiple grains that are connected on the grain scale.  These can include grains which are sand-sized themselves (a granitic rock fragment), or finer-grained materials (shale fragments).  This definition is used for QFR ternary diagrams, provenance analysis, and in the Folk classification scheme, mainly in sandstones.

References

Folk, R.L., 1974, Petrology of Sedimentary Rocks: Austin, TX, Hemphill Press, second edition, 182 p.

Petrology